Sansa is a village in Aurangabad district, Bihar, India,. The village is situated on the road joining Daudnagar to Haspura.

Nearby educational institutions
B.L. Indo Anglian Public School, Aurangabad, on NH-98 25 km from Daudnagar

References

Villages in Aurangabad district, Bihar